The second series of the British children's television series The Story of Tracy Beaker began broadcasting on 7 January 2003 on CBBC and ended on 3 April 2003. The series follows the lives of the children living in the fictional children's care home of Stowey House, nicknamed by them "The Dumping Ground". It consists of twenty-six, fifteen-minute episodes. It is the second series in The Story of Tracy Beaker franchise.

Cast

Dani Harmer (Tracy Beaker), Montanna Thompson (Justine Littlewood), Chelsie Padley (Louise Govern), Rochelle Gadd (Adele Azupadi), Nisha Nayar (Elaine Boyak), Clive Rowe (Duke), Sharlene Whyte (Jenny Edwards), Luke Youngblood (Ben Batambuze) and Lisa Coleman (Cam Lawson) all returned to their main roles and Stephen Crossley returned to his guest starring role as Justine's father, Steve Littlewood. Sonny Muslim (Ryan Matthews), Jay Haher (Zac Matthews), Joe Starrs (Peter Ingham), Jerome Holder (Maxy) and Connor Byrne (Mike Milligan) did not return for the second series, but Byrne reprised his role in the final series. Ciaran Joyce, Ben Hanson, Chloe Hibbert-Waters, Alicia Hooper and James Cartwright all made their debuts as main characters, Lol Plakova, Bouncer Plakova, Dolly, Amber Hearst and Nathan Jones respectively. This was the last series to feature Gadd, Whyte, Youngblood and Hooper and the last series to feature Padley as a main cast member.

Main

Guest

Episodes

Production
Cas Lester was the executive producer and Jane Dauncey was the producer for this series. Filming took place in 2002, after the end of series 1 had aired. Susan Tully and David Skynner didn't return to direct series 2 and were replaced Delyth Thomas, who directed fourteen episodes, and Joss Agnew, who directed twelve episodes. Elly Brewer (who later returned as head writer), Arnold Evans, Carol Russell, Roger Griffiths and Graham Alborough didn't return to writing for series 2. Ian Carrey, Gary Parker, Rob Gittins, Tracy Brabin, Lucy Flannery, Abigal Abben Mensah and writing duo, Sam Bain & Jesse Armstrong replaced those who had left. Returning from series 1 is Mary Morris, Laura Summers, Othniel Smith and Andy Walker. Morris and Summers wrote five episodes each; Smith wrote four episodes; Walker, Parker and duo, Bain & Armstrong wrote two episodes; Carney, Gittins, Brabin, Flannery and Mensah all wrote one episode each. Parker and Gittins wrote an episode together as well.

Awards and nominations

References

The Story of Tracy Beaker
2003 British television seasons